Strong Persuader is the fifth studio album by American blues singer and guitarist Robert Cray. It was recorded by Cray at the Los Angeles studios Sage & Sound and Haywood's with producers Bruce Bromberg and Dennis Walker, before being released on November 17, 1986, by Mercury Records and Hightone Records. Strong Persuader became his mainstream breakthrough and by 1995 it had sold over two million copies. The record was later ranked #42 on Rolling Stone's list of the 100 greatest albums of the 80's.

Critical reception 

Strong Persuader received rave reviews from contemporary critics. In a review for Rolling Stone, Jon Pareles said Cray delivered intriguing stories about sex and infidelity with disciplined singing, songwriting, and "a version of blues and soul that doesn't come from any one region, building an idiom for songs that tell with conversational directness the stories of ordinary folks". Robert Christgau from The Village Voice praised Cray's sophisticated blues aesthetic and the songwriting of his supporting studio team, hailing Strong Persuader as "the best blues record in many, many years, so fervently crafted that it may even get what it deserves and become the first album to break out of the genre's sales ghetto since B.B. King was a hot item."

At the end of 1986, Strong Persuader was voted the third best album of the year in the Pazz & Jop, an annual poll of American critics published by The Village Voice. Christgau, the poll's supervisor, ranked it fourth on his own year-end list. In a retrospective review, AllMusic critic Bill Dahl said "it was [Cray's] innovative expansion of the genre itself that makes this album a genuine 1980s classic."

Track listing
"Smoking Gun" (David Amy, Richard Cousins, Robert Cray) – 4:07
"I Guess I Showed Her" (Dennis Walker) – 3:39
"Right Next Door (Because of Me)" (Dennis Walker) – 4:19
"Nothin' But a Woman" (David Amy, Cousins, Cray, Peter Boe, David Olson) – 3:58
"Still Around" (Peter Boe) – 3:42
"More Than I Can Stand" (Cray) – 2:57
"Foul Play" (Dennis Walker) – 4:07
"I Wonder" (Cray) – 3:57
"Fantasized" (Dennis Walker) – 4:04
"New Blood" (David Amy, Peter Boe, Cray, Ozall Washington) – 4:21

Personnel
 Fidel Bell – mixing assistant
 Charlie Brocco – mixing assistant
 Peter Boe – keyboards
 Bruce Bromberg – producer (songwriting credit: David Amy)
 Richard Cousins – bass
 Robert Cray – main performer, guitar, vocals
 David Olson – drums
 Lee Spath – percussion
 Andrew Love – tenor saxophone
 Wayne Jackson – trumpet, trombone

Singles

Charts

Weekly charts

Year-end charts

Certifications

References

External links
 

1986 albums
Robert Cray albums
Mercury Records albums
Grammy Award for Best Contemporary Blues Album